Gayophytum is a genus of annual herbs in the evening primrose family known commonly as groundsmoke. There are about nine species of groundsmoke, most of which are native to western North America. These are erect flowering herbs generally well under a metre in height and with narrow leaves. They produce white flowers which fade to pink or red.

Species include:
Gayophytum decipiens - deceptive groundsmoke
Gayophytum diffusum - spreading groundsmoke
Gayophytum eriospermum - Coville's groundsmoke
Gayophytum heterozygum - zigzag groundsmoke
Gayophytum humile - dwarf groundsmoke
Gayophytum oligospermum - pinegrove groundsmoke
Gayophytum racemosum - blackfoot groundsmoke
Gayophytum ramosissimum - pinyon groundsmoke

External links
Jepson Manual Treatment

 
Onagraceae genera